Agapion is an old and rare Russian male first name. It is derived from the Greek verb agapaō, meaning to love.

The patronymics derived from "Agapion" are "" (Agapionovich; masculine) and "" (Agapionovna; feminine).

See also
Agap
Agapa

References

Notes

Sources
Н. А. Петровский (N. A. Petrovsky). "Словарь русских личных имён" (Dictionary of Russian First Names). ООО Издательство "АСТ". Москва, 2005. 

